Patricia Libia Rodríguez Orejuela (born 25 October 1970) is a retired Colombian athlete who specialised in the sprinting events. She represented her country at the 1996 Summer Olympics, as well as the 1995 and 1997 World Championships. In addition, she won multiple medals on regional level.

Competition record

1 Did not finish in the final

Personal bests
Outdoor
100 metres – 11.51 (-1.1 m/s) (Medellín 1997)
200 metres – 23.13 (+0.1 m/s) (Atlanta 1996)
400 metres – 51.89 (Edwardsville 2003)
Indoor
200 metres – 25.57 (Chapel Hill 2002)
400 metres – 53.83 (Boston 2003)

References

1970 births
Living people
Colombian female sprinters
Athletes (track and field) at the 1996 Summer Olympics
Athletes (track and field) at the 1995 Pan American Games
Athletes (track and field) at the 1999 Pan American Games
Athletes (track and field) at the 2003 Pan American Games
Olympic athletes of Colombia
World Athletics Championships athletes for Colombia
Pan American Games medalists in athletics (track and field)
Pan American Games bronze medalists for Colombia
South American Games silver medalists for Colombia
South American Games medalists in athletics
Competitors at the 1994 South American Games
Competitors at the 1995 Summer Universiade
Medalists at the 1995 Pan American Games
Central American and Caribbean Games medalists in athletics
Olympic female sprinters
20th-century Colombian women
21st-century Colombian women